Eyleh-ye Yek (also Romanized as ‘Eyleh-ye Yek; also known as ‘Asīleh-e Yek and Sheykh Hādī) is a village in Shoaybiyeh-ye Gharbi Rural District, Shadravan District, Shushtar County, Khuzestan Province, Iran. At the 2006 census, its population was 472, in 89 families.

References 

Populated places in Shushtar County